Old Republic International Corporation is an American property insurance and title and deed company. The company is headquartered in Chicago, Illinois.

References

External links
 

Companies based in Chicago
Companies listed on the New York Stock Exchange
Insurance companies based in Illinois